Shaun Baxter (born 2 October 1978) is a former Australian rules footballer who was drafted by the Western Bulldogs.

Baxter was drafted to Footscray, as the Western Bulldogs were known then, as selection 49 in the 1994 AFL draft from the Geelong Falcons under-18s via Geelong & District Football League club, Bannockburn. His short AFL career was heavily hampered by a battle with nasopharyngeal carcinoma, type of cancer, that he survived. Baxter's fight with the illness was highlighted in the documentary of the Year of the Dogs during the turbulent 1996 season for the Western Bulldogs. His health contributed to Baxter never playing an AFL game. He later spent some time on Geelong Football Club's supplementary list as a reserves player, before moving to Western Australia and playing for East Perth.

In late 2020, Beechworth Football Club appointed Baxter as non playing coach.

References

External links
WAFL playing statistics

1978 births
Living people
Australian rules footballers from Victoria (Australia)
Geelong Falcons players
East Perth Football Club players